Lianovergion railway station is a currently closed railway station in Lianovergi, Greece. It was opened by the OSE. Located just south of the centre of the settlement, The station is not much more than a request halt.

History

Facilities
The station is equipped solely with a waiting room on the single platform.

Services
The station is served by Regional stopping services to Florina  and Thessaloniki, and since 9 September 2007 by Thessaloniki Suburban services or Proastiakos to Edessa and Thessaloniki.

Accidents and incidents

2015 accident
On 11 July 2015, a 46-year-old woman died after being hit by a train close to the station. According to the police, the incident happened at 12.10, when, for unknown reasons, a passenger train, running from Florina to Thessaloniki, just before the Lianovergi station, dragged the woman, a local from Paleochori along the line. Trains in the area stopped for about an hour while an investigation was conducted.

2016 accident
On 11 July 2015, a 28-year-old died after being hit by a train a few meters from the station. Preliminary investigation into the exact causes of the accident was carried out by the Plateos Police Department.

Station layout

References

Railway stations in Eastern Macedonia and Thrace
Railway stations opened in 1971
Buildings and structures in Evros (regional unit)